Jŏngbang Castle is a Koguryo-era mountain fortress located outside Sariwŏn, North Hwanghae Province, North Korea. Cresting the ridges of Mt. Jŏngbang, the castle was founded as a fortress for the defence of the Koguryo capital of Pyongyang. Rebuilt in 1632, the castle is encircled by over 12 kilometres of 6-metre high stone walls, which extend to over ten metres tall in some places. The walls are pierced by four large gates, the most well preserved of which is the south one. Inside the castle, there are the ruins of commander's posts, barracks, arsenals, armories, granaries, storehouses.

The famous Sŏngbul Temple, founded in 898 and containing some of the oldest wooden buildings in North Korea, is located within the castle's walls.

See also
 Taehŭng Castle
 National Treasures of North Korea

References

 

1632 establishments in Asia
17th-century establishments in Korea
Archaeological sites in North Korea
Buddhist archaeological sites in Korea
Buildings and structures completed in 1632
Buildings and structures in North Hwanghae Province
Castles in North Korea
National Treasures of North Korea